Ilex hicksii is a species of plant in the family Aquifoliaceae. It is endemic to Western New Guinea, occurring to 2300 metres above sea level.

References

hicksii